Ricardo Penson (born June 9, 1952) is a Filipino business executive and social activist. At present, he is the president and chief executive officer of Ausphil Tollways Corporation a Manila-based transport infrastructure development company and Penson & Company, Inc. He ran and lost as an independent candidate for the 2013 Philippine Senate elections.

He advocates for an end to political dynasties in the Philippines and believes that immediate family members should be prohibited from running for public office regardless of the place or position. In November 2012, he launched the Krusada Kontra Dynasty movement in order to further campaign for this advocacy. If elected as senator, he vows to pass a bill prohibiting political dynasties and that he would resign if it fails to become a law.

Penson is single but was previously married to four women, the most notable of which was with Filipina actress Dina Bonnevie in 1996. The annulment of his marriage with Bonnevie in 1999 became the topic of showbiz news after he was accused of being psychologically incapable of being married.

However, records of the MTC Quezon City shows the Judge's Order of Annulment stating that Geraldyn Bonnevie is psychologically incapacitated in as much as it was her that submitted to a psychological evaluation therefore husband Penson cannot be found incapacitated.  Penson, aside from being the CEO of Ausphil Tollways, is Chairman of Defense Resources Inc and Philco Aero Inc., original proponent of the Clark International Airport Terminal 2 Project.

References

Independent politicians in the Philippines
People from Caloocan
San Beda University alumni
University of Cincinnati alumni
Wharton School of the University of Pennsylvania alumni
1952 births
Living people
Businesspeople from Metro Manila
People from Pasig